Plattsmouth is a city and county seat of Cass County, Nebraska, United States.  The population was 6,502 at the 2010 census.

History
The Lewis and Clark Expedition passed the mouth of the Platte River, just north of what is now Main Street Plattsmouth, on July 21, 1804.

Plattsmouth first appeared in 1854 as "the Barracks", a trading post established by Sam Martin, owner of the Platteville ferry in neighboring Mills County, Iowa, ferryman Wheatley Mickelwait, and Glenwood, Iowa attorney and politician Colonel Joseph Longworthy Sharp. The community was renamed Plattsmouth for its location at the mouth of the Platte River, and was incorporated on March 15, 1855.
   
The organization of the city under the charter of March 1855 was effected December 29, 1856, by the election of Wheatley Mickelwait to the Mayoralty, and Enos Williams, W. M. Slaughter and Jacob Vallery, Aldermen. This Council met and proceeded to business on January 29, 1857, their first ordinance, approved by the Mayor March 2, 1857, levying a tax of one-half of 1 per cent on all taxable property within the corporate limits of the city of Plattsmouth, the amount collected to be expended in the improvement of the streets and alleys and steamboat landings at and in the city. On December 7, 1857, the Council voted each member an annual salary of $100, being something over $16 apiece for each session held during the year. This is a noticeable fact, in view of the action taken by the succeeding Council on December 30, 1858, in ordaining that the Mayor and Alderman receive for their services during that year the sum of 5 cents each, payable in city scrip; the Assessor, Recorder and Treasurer being paid $25 apiece for the same term.

Geography
Plattsmouth is located at  (41.008699, -95.891643).

Demographics

2020 census
As of the census of 2020, there were 6,544 people and 2,629 households living in the city. The racial makeup of the city was 92.8% White, 0.2% African American, 0.2% Native American, 0.5% Asian, 0.0% Pacific Islander, 4.5% from two or more races. Hispanic or Latino of any race were 4.7% of the population.

2010 census
As of the census of 2010, there were 6,502 people, 2,525 households, and 1,620 families living in the city. The racial makeup of the city was 95.3% White, 0.6% African American, 0.4% Native American, 0.2% Asian, 0.2% Pacific Islander, 1.0% from other races, and 2.3% from two or more races. Hispanic or Latino of any race were 4.0% of the population.

There were 2,525 households, of which 34.9% had children under the age of 18 living with them, 46.9% were married couples living together, 12.2% had a female householder with no husband present, 5.1% had a male householder with no wife present, and 35.8% were non-families. 30.5% of all households were made up of individuals, and 13.3% had someone living alone who was 65 years of age or older. The average household size was 2.48 and the average family size was 3.09.

The median age in the city was 36.5 years. 26.6% of residents were under the age of 18; 7.8% were between the ages of 18 and 24; 26.5% were from 25 to 44; 24.4% were from 45 to 64; and 14.7% were 65 years of age or older. The gender makeup of the city was 49.4% male and 50.6% female.

2000 census
As of the census of 2000, there were 6,887 people, 2,618 households, and 1,780 families living in the city. The population density was 2,381.6 people per square mile (920.1/km). There were 2,805 housing units at an average density of 970.0 per square mile (374.7/km). The racial makeup of the city was 97.36% White, 0.30% African American, 0.51% Native American, 0.52% Asian, 0.01% Pacific Islander, 0.46% from other races, and 0.83% from two or more races. Hispanic or Latino of any race were 2.00% of the population.

There were 2,618 households, out of which 37.4% had children under the age of 18 living with them, 51.6% were married couples living together, 11.8% had a female householder with no husband present, and 32.0% were non-families. 27.0% of all households were made up of individuals, and 12.0% had someone living alone who was 65 years of age or older. The average household size was 2.56 and the average family size was 3.10.

In the city, the population was spread out, with 29.1% under the age of 18, 8.8% from 18 to 24, 29.5% from 25 to 44, 18.8% from 45 to 64, and 13.9% who were 65 years of age or older. The median age was 33 years. For every 100 females, there were 92.5 males. For every 100 females age 18 and over, there were 87.0 males.

As of 2000 the median income for a household in the city was $38,844, and the median income for a family was $43,425. Males had a median income of $32,702 versus $22,032 for females. The per capita income for the city was $17,153. About 6.5% of families and 7.0% of the population were below the poverty line, including 10.0% of those under age 18 and 5.5% of those age 65 or over.

Notable people

 Hazel Abel, U.S. Senator
 Raymond Chandler, detective fiction writer
 John Philip Falter, artist
 Oscar Graham, baseball player
 Danny Lockin, actor, dancer, "Hello, Dolly!" 1969 movie and Broadway.
 Paul Newlan, actor
 John O'Rourke, businessman, Wisconsin state legislator, mayor of Plattsmouth; O'Rourke was the subject of the American Civil War song: When Johnny Comes Marching Home

See also
 Omaha Southern Railroad

References

External links

 City of Plattsmouth
 Plattsmouth Chamber of Commerce
 City-Data.com
 

Cities in Cass County, Nebraska
Cities in Nebraska
County seats in Nebraska
Nebraska populated places on the Missouri River